Amnat Ruenroeng (IPA:; born December 18, 1979), also known as Amnat Kasetphatthana is a Thai professional boxer and kickboxer who held the IBF flyweight title from 2014 to 2016.

Early life
Ruenroeng was born without knowing who his parents were, when he was first born he didn't even have a birth certificate because the officer refused to register him due to not being sure he was Thai. He grew up in his grandmother's care in poverty and had to fight at the age of seven, starting in Muay Thai named "Petch Por Burapha" (เพชร ป.บูรพา) and "Petch Tor Bang Saen" (เพชร ต.บางแสน) and won Lumpinee Stadium champion Flyweight division.

Amateur career 
Ruenroeng began boxing while serving a fifteen-year prison sentence for robbery. In 2007, he won a Thai national title in the Light Flyweight division, and was released from prison for good behaviour the following day having served one year. He won a bronze medal as a junior flyweight at the 2007 World Amateur Boxing Championships in Chicago. He had lost in the semi-final to Philippines southpaw Harry Tanamor.

Ruenroeng took the gold medal at the King's Cup in Bangkok in 2008 after defeating Kazuto Ioka in the semifinal. He subsequently qualified to represent Thailand at the 2008 Summer Olympics in Beijing.

Professional career 
Ruenroeng made his professional debut in 2012. On 22 January 2014, he won the vacant IBF Flyweight title by defeating Rocky Fuentes. In his first defense, he traveled to Japan and earned a split decision over undefeated two-division champion Kazuto Ioka, who was making his flyweight debut. In his following fight, he defeated Puerto Rican challenger McWilliams Arroyo by split decision. On March 7, 2015, he earned a unanimous decision over undefeated two-time Olympic gold medalist Zou Shiming.

Ruenrong vs. Casimero

IBF flyweight titleholder Amnat Ruenroeng retained his belt with a 12-round decision win over Filipino boxer Johnriel Casimero at the Hua Mark Indoor Stadium in Bangkok, Thailand, on Saturday, June 27. Ruenroeng (16-0, 5 knockouts) was credited with two knockdowns against Casimero (21-3, 13 KOs), beginning with a counter right in Round 2 that caught the 25-year-old from Ormoc City lunging in. A second knockdown was called in Round 7 when Casimero was pushed into the ropes by Ruenroeng following a glancing right hand. Casimero appeared to knock Ruenroeng down in Round 3 when a counter left hook caused his glove to touch the canvas, but referee Larry Doggett ruled it a slip. The fight was marred by excessive clinching and over a dozen throwdowns by Ruenroeng. Doggett issued five warnings before finally taking a point from Ruenroeng in Round 11. “Amnat made the strategy how to win easy. It was not a dirty fight,” said Ruenroeng's trainer, Aljoe Jaro, who claims Casimero had hit Ruenroeng in the leg during the fight. “About the throwing down, that’s not an issue. Casimero was also playing dirty. Amnat was doing his job as a boxer how to win.”

The roughhouse tactics detracted from an otherwise crafty, resourceful performance from the Thai incumbent champion, whose jab disrupted the rhythm of Casimero, who held the IBF junior flyweight title for two years before being stripped last year for failing to make weight for his fight with Mauricio Fuentes. Casimero was the aggressor for the final 3 rounds, desperately trying to score a knockout to erase the deficit he found himself in.

Ruenroeng, 35, has now defended his belt four times successfully since winning it in January 2014 with a victory over Filipino contender Rocky Fuentes.

Ruenroeng vs. Casimero II

On May 25, 2016, in Diamond Court of the National Tennis Center, Beijing China, Ruenroeng fought Casimero again in a rematch for the IBF flyweight title and loss via knockout with a vicious body shot in the 4th round, ending Ruenroeng's undefeated streak.

After world champion
After losing the world championship, he did not retire. Instead, he continued to fight, returning to his roots as an amateur. Going up to the Lightweight division, he participated in the 2016 Summer Olympics in Rio de Janeiro. He won his opening bout before losing in the round of 16 against Sofiane Oumiha, a younger fighter representing France. Oumiha eventually earned the silver medal, and went on to win gold at the world championships in 2017.

After the Olympics, Ruenroeng returned to Muay Thai. On April 21, 2018, he competed again as a professional. He was knocked out in 5th round by a younger fighter, his fellow-countryman Nawaphon Por Chokchai.

Ruenroeng vs. Sor Rungvisai 
On 1 August 2020, Ruenroeng fought former world champion Srisaket Sor Rungvisai. Ruenroeng was game, and fought a close fight, but in the end didn't do enough to earn the win. Rungvisai won an all three judges scorecards, 99–91, 97-94 and 96–93.

Professional boxing record

Muay Thai record

|-  style="background:#fbb;"
| 2018-06-01 ||Loss ||align=left| Lin Qiangbang || Kunlun Fight Macao|| Macau, China || Decision (Unanimous) || 3 || 3:00
|-  style="background:#fbb;"
| 2017-02-12|| Loss ||align=left| Tenshin Nasukawa || Knock Out Vol. 1 || Tokyo, Japan || KO (left hook to the body) || 4 || 2:39
|-  style="background:#cfc;"
| 2016-12-24 ||Win ||align=left| Albert Amirdzhanyan|| Thai Fight 2016 || Bangkok, Thailand || Decision || 5 || 3:00
|-  style="background:#fbb;"
| 2004-12-07 ||Loss ||align=left| Sam-A Gaiyanghadao || Lumpinee Stadium || Bangkok, Thailand || Decision || 5 || 3:00
|-  style="background:#cfc;"
| 2004-10-09 ||Win ||align=left| Sam-A Gaiyanghadao || Lumpinee Stadium || Bangkok, Thailand || Decision || 5 || 3:00
|-  style="background:#cfc;"
| 2004-09-14 ||Win ||align=left| Pettawee Sor Kittichai || Lumpinee Stadium || Bangkok, Thailand || Decision || 5 || 3:00
|-  style="background:#fbb;"
| 2004-05-28 ||Loss ||align=left| Sam-A Gaiyanghadao || Lumpinee Stadium || Bangkok, Thailand || Decision || 5 || 3:00

|-  style="background:#cfc;"
| 2004-04-21 || Win||align=left| Rungruanglek Lukprabat || Lumpinee Stadium || Bangkok, Thailand ||Decision || 5 || 3:00

|-  style="background:#fbb;"
| 2004-03-30 ||Loss ||align=left| Sam-A Gaiyanghadao || Lumpinee Stadium || Bangkok, Thailand || Decision || 5 || 3:00

|-  style="background:#c5d2ea;"
| 2000-08-05 || Draw||align=left| Rungrit Sitchamlong || Lumpinee Stadium || Bangkok, Thailand ||Decision || 5 || 3:00

|-  style="background:#fbb;"
| 2000-02-11 || Loss ||align=left| Wanpichai Sor.Khamsing || Lumpinee Stadium || Bangkok, Thailand || Decision || 5 || 3:00
|-
|-  style="background:#fbb;"
| 2000-01-25 || Loss ||align=left| Thongchai Tor.Silachai || Lumpinee Stadium || Bangkok, Thailand || Decision || 5 || 3:00

|-  style="background:#cfc;"
| 1999-11-26 || Win||align=left| Kongprai Phayaklemon || Lumpinee Stadium || Bangkok, Thailand ||Decision || 5 || 3:00

|-  style="background:#cfc;"
| 1999-09-03 || Win||align=left| Dansiam Kiatrungroj || Lumpinee Stadium || Bangkok, Thailand || KO|| ||

|-  style="background:#cfc;"
| 1999-07-17 || Win||align=left| Kongprai Phayaklemon || Lumpinee Stadium || Bangkok, Thailand ||Decision || 5 || 3:00

|-  style="background:#cfc;"
| 1999-05-02 || Win||align=left| Ekachai Chaibadan||  || Bangkok, Thailand || Decision || 5 || 3:00
|-
| colspan=8 | Legend:

References

External links
 
"Amnat Ruenroeng", n°56 on Time’s list of "100 Olympic Athletes To Watch"
Results.beijing2008.cn - Bio
Biographies for Amnat Ruenroeng International Boxing Association
Amnat Ruenroeng - Profile, News Archive & Current Rankings at Box.Live

Living people
Light-flyweight boxers
Amnat Ruenroeng
Boxers at the 2008 Summer Olympics
Boxers at the 2016 Summer Olympics
1979 births
Asian Games medalists in boxing
Boxers at the 2010 Asian Games
Amnat Ruenroeng
Amnat Ruenroeng
AIBA World Boxing Championships medalists
Amnat Ruenroeng
Medalists at the 2010 Asian Games
Amnat Ruenroeng
Flyweight kickboxers
Southeast Asian Games medalists in boxing
Amnat Ruenroeng
Kunlun Fight kickboxers
Competitors at the 2007 Southeast Asian Games
Competitors at the 2009 Southeast Asian Games
Sportspeople convicted of crimes